In oceanography, the term spice refers to spatial variations in the temperature and salinity of seawater whose effects on density cancel each other.  Such density compensated thermohaline variability is ubiquitous in the upper ocean. Warmer, saltier water is more spicy while cooler, less salty water is more minty.  For a density ratio of 1, all the thermohaline variability is spice, and there are no density fluctuations.

References

Oceanography